Catherine L. Barrett of Cincinnati, Ohio, United States, is a former Democratic member of the Ohio House of Representatives, who served for eight years, the applicable term limit for that body.  Previously, she served as mayor of Forest Park, Ohio.

She also served as a delegate for John Kerry on the Ohio delegation to the 2004 Democratic National Convention in Boston.

References

External links
Profile on the Ohio Ladies' Gallery website

Members of the Ohio House of Representatives
Women state legislators in Ohio
Living people
Year of birth missing (living people)
21st-century American politicians
21st-century American women politicians
20th-century American politicians
20th-century American women politicians
Women mayors of places in Ohio
Mayors of places in Ohio